The 1912 Livingstone football team represented Livingstone College in the 1912 college football season as an independent. Led by coach Benjamin Butler Church in his first year, Livingstone compiled a 3–1–1 record, shutting out three opponents.

Schedule

References

Livingstone
Livingstone Blue Bears football seasons
Livingstone football